Married Alive is a 1927 American silent comedy film directed by Emmett J. Flynn and written by Gertrude Orr. The film stars Margaret Livingston, Matt Moore, Claire Adams, Gertrude Claire, Marcella Daly and Henry Sedley. The film was released on July 17, 1927, by Fox Film Corporation.

Cast
Lou Tellegen as James Duxbury
Margaret Livingston as Amy Duxbury
Matt Moore as Charles Orme
Claire Adams as Viola Helmesley Duxbury
Gertrude Claire as Lady Rockett
Marcella Daly as Blanche Fountain Duxbury
Henry Sedley as Max Ferbur
Eric Mayne as Dr. McMaster
Charles Willis Lane as Mr. Fountain
Emily Fitzroy as Mrs. Maggs Duxbury

Preservation status
The film is currently lost.

References

External links 
 

1927 films
1920s English-language films
Fox Film films
Silent American comedy films
1927 comedy films
Films directed by Emmett J. Flynn
American black-and-white films
American silent feature films
Lost American films
1927 lost films
Lost comedy films
1920s American films